Yahya Hussain Al-Aarashi (born 1947) is a Yemeni diplomat and former government minister. Starting in the 1960s he held positions in Al Hudaydah Governorate. By the 1970s he was directing a Yemeni Development bank. He served as Minister of Culture and Information in 1976. From 1986 until 1990 he served as Minister of State for Unity Affairs. From 1993 until 1999 he served as Minister of Culture and Tourism.

He quit his position as Ambassador to Qatar over the 2011 Yemeni uprising.

Sources

References 

1947 births
Yemeni diplomats
Ambassadors of Yemen to Qatar
Living people
20th-century Yemeni politicians
21st-century Yemeni politicians
Culture ministers of Yemen
Ambassadors of Yemen to Tunisia
General People's Congress (Yemen) politicians
Ambassadors of North Yemen
Ambassadors of Yemen to Germany
Ambassadors of Yemen to Morocco
Members of the Consultative Assembly of Yemen
Attas Cabinet
Abdulghani Cabinet